The following is a list of construction completed or planned by the Nazi Party from the party's formation in 1920 until the end of World War II in 1945.

Buildings and architecture

Urban planning projects
Führer city, status given to five German cities in 1937 for a planned gigantic urban transformation
Führer Headquarters, buildings used as headquarters by Adolf Hitler
Nordstern, a planned new German metropolis in occupied Norway
Pabst Plan, plan to reconstruct the Warsaw as a Nazi model city. 
Germania, the projected renewal of Berlin.

Other projects
Atlantic Wall (Atlantikwall)
Reichsautobahn

Nazi construction